Alexandre Silveira Finazzi (born 20 August 1973), known as Finazzi, is a Brazilian professional football manager and former professional footballer who played as a striker.

Biography
Finazzi had a journeyman career. Despite born in Brazil, he is known as Mr. Finazzi instead of other artist name derived from given name or nickname, which the latter was more common in Brazil. Finazzi had a brief spells in 2000–01 French Division 2 before returned to Brazil. It was followed by another brief career in Japan in January 2003. In June 2003 Finazzi returned to Brazil.

In January 2005 he signed a contract for América until the end of 2005 Campeonato Paulista. Finazzi was the topscorer of the state league. In May 2005 Finazzi left for Paulista for 2005 Campeonato Brasileiro Série B. In July 2005 Finazzi moved to Atlético Paranaense for 2005 Campeonato Brasileiro Série A.

In February 2006 Finazzi signed a 1-year contract with Fortaleza. The club relegated from 2006 Campeonato Brasileiro Série A. In January 2007 Finazzi left for Ponte Preta until the end of 2007 Campeonato Paulista during which he scored 12 goals. In May 2007 Finazzi was signed by another top division club Corinthians. Finazzi signed a new 1-year deal in January 2008, after the club relegated to 2008 Campeonato Brasileiro Série B. In June 2008 Finazzi left for São Caetano in 1-year deal. In January 2009 Finazzi left for Mirassol until the end of 2009 Campeonato Paulista. In May 2009 Finazzi left for Mixto until the end of 2009 Campeonato Brasileiro Série C. In September 2009 Finazzi returned to Ponte Preta for the remainder of 2009 Campeonato Brasileiro Série B.

In December 2009 Finazzi signed a new 1-year deal. In July 2010 Finazzi left for Fortaleza until the end of 2010 Campeonato Brasileiro Série C. In September 2010 Finazzi moved to Bragantino until the end of 2010 Campeonato Brasileiro Série B. In March 2011 Finazzi left for Remo. In July 2011 he was signed by Goiânia. In August 2011 Finazzi was signed by Anapolina. In September 2011 Finazzi returned to Bragantino again.

In February 2012 Finazzi left for XV de Jaú until the end of 2012 Campeonato Paulista Série A3.

Personal honours
São Paulo State League's Top Scorer: 2005

References

External links
 
 
 
 
 globoesporte 

Brazilian footballers
Guarani FC players
São Paulo FC players
Botafogo Futebol Clube (SP) players
Esporte Clube Novo Hamburgo players
Goiânia Esporte Clube players
FC Sochaux-Montbéliard players
Vila Nova Futebol Clube players
Goiás Esporte Clube players
Sociedade Esportiva do Gama players
Omiya Ardija players
Fortaleza Esporte Clube players
ABC Futebol Clube players
América Futebol Clube (SP) players
Paulista Futebol Clube players
Club Athletico Paranaense players
Associação Atlética Ponte Preta players
Sport Club Corinthians Paulista players
Associação Desportiva São Caetano players
Mirassol Futebol Clube players
Mixto Esporte Clube players
Clube Atlético Bragantino players
Clube do Remo players
Associação Atlética Anapolina players
Esporte Clube XV de Novembro (Jaú) players
Brazilian expatriate footballers
Expatriate footballers in France
Expatriate footballers in Japan
Ligue 2 players
J2 League players
Association football forwards
Brazilian people of Italian descent
1973 births
Living people
People from São João da Boa Vista